The 23nd season of Taniec z gwiazdami, the Polish edition of Dancing with the Stars, started on 13 September 2019. This is the tenth season aired on Polsat. Paulina Sykut-Jeżyna and Krzysztof Ibisz returned as host and Iwona Pavlović, Michał Malitowski and Andrzej Grabowski returned as judges. Ola Jordan did not return as a judge.

Couples

Scores

Red numbers indicate the lowest score for each week.
Green numbers indicate the highest score for each week.
 indicates the couple eliminated that week.
 indicates the returning couple that finished in the bottom two or three.
 indicates the couple saved from elimination by immunity.
 indicates the winning couple.
 indicates the runner-up.
 indicates the couple in third place.

Average score chart 
This table only counts for dances scored on a 30-points scale.

Highest and lowest scoring performances 
The best and worst performances in each dance according to the judges' 30-point scale:

Couples' highest and lowest scoring dances

According to the 30-point scale:

Weekly scores
Unless indicated otherwise, individual judges scores in the charts below (given in parentheses) are listed in this order from left to right: Andrzej Grabowski, Iwona Pavlović and Michał Malitowski.

Week 1: Season Premiere

Running order

Week 2

Running order

Week 3: Hometown Glory

Running order

Week 4: 80s Week 

Running order

Week 5: Auntie's Nameday Party 
Individual judges scores in the charts below (given in parentheses) are listed in this order from left to right: Andrzej Grabowski, Iwona Pavlović and Kris Adamski.

Running order

Week 6: 100th Episode - Polish Radio Hits 
No elimination took place.
Running order

*Due to injury, Adam was unable to dance this week.

Week 7: Family and Friends Dances 

Running order

Week 8: Movie Week
Running order

Week 9: Trio Challenge (Semi-final)
Running order

Dance-off

Running order

Week 10: Season Finale
Running order

Other Dances

Dance chart
The celebrities and professional partners danced one of these routines for each corresponding week:
Week 1 (Season Premiere): Cha-cha-cha, Jive, Tango, Waltz
Week 2: One unlearned dance (introducing Viennese Waltz, Foxtrot, Quickstep)
Week 3 (Hometown Glory): One unlearned dance (introducing Rumba, Paso Doble)
Week 4 (80s Week): One unlearned dance (introducing Samba)
Week 5 (Auntie's Nameday Party): Improvisation Marathon and one unlearned dance
Week 6 (100th Episode - Polish Radio Hits): One unlearned dance (introducing Contemporary) and dance-offs
Week 7 (Family and Friends Dances): One unlearned dance (introducing Salsa, Charleston, Swing) and one repeated dance Monika & Jan, Magda & Kamil and Ola & Tomasz: Two unlearned dances
Week 8 (Movie Week): One unlearned dance (introducing Bollywood) and one repeated dance Barbara & Jacek: Two unlearned dances
Week 9 (Semi-final: Trio Challenge): One repeated dance, one unlearned dance and dance-offs
Week 10 (Season Finale): Couple's favorite dance of the season, one unlearned dance and Showdance

 Highest scoring dance
 Lowest scoring dance
 Performed, but not scored
 Bonus points
 Gained bonus points for winning this dance-off
 Gained no bonus points for losing this dance-off

Guest performances

Rating figures

References

External links
 

Season 22
2019 Polish television seasons